"Motherfucker" is a song by American band Faith No More, the first single from their seventh studio album Sol Invictus. It was released on Record Store Day's Black Friday, November 28, 2014. It is the band's first release of new studio recorded material since Album of the Year (1997), breaking a 17-year hiatus.

Background and release

"Motherfucker" was first played in concert during July 2014's British Summer Time Hyde Park, along with another new song called "Superhero". Bassist Billy Gould later revealed in an interview to Rolling Stone that the band was on the way to release a new album in April 2015, also stating "Motherfucker" was going to be the first single from it, with a limited print of 5,000 seven-inch copies on Record Store Day. It will also feature a remix by J. G. Thirlwell on the B-side. The cover artwork is made by Cali Dewitt with a photograph by James Gritz.

On the song, keyboardist Roddy Bottum stated:

Reception
Christopher R. Weingarten of Rolling Stone wrote that the song "marches forth with the doom-laden raps of their 1989 breakthrough The Real Thing, the triumphant choruses of their 1997 swan-song Album of the Year, the moan-to-screech dynamics of Mike Patton's avant-minded solo career and a merciless snare cadence tip-tapping at the edges of sanity." Gregory Adams of Exclaim! stated the song "takes on properties of the FNM of old, whether it be Mike Patton's The Real Thing rap cadence, or the way the vocalist can easily turn out soaring vocal melodies to gruff and grizzly growls targeting the 'motherfucker' that tricked them in their youth." Adams also further added: "The music is likewise epic, evolving from spacious and sinister piano lines into a grand rock escapade." Ed Keeble of Gigwise described the track as "very rude, very noisy, very political: all the prerequisites that make a Faith No More song awesome."

Personnel
Faith No More
 Mike Bordin – drums
 Roddy Bottum – keyboards, vocals
 Billy Gould – bass guitar, producer, recording engineer, mixing engineer
 Jon Hudson – guitar
 Mike Patton – vocals

Production
 Billy Gould – producer, recording engineer, mixing engineer
 Maor Appelbaum – mastering engineer

Charts

References

External links
 

Faith No More songs
2014 singles
2014 songs
Record Store Day releases
Ipecac Recordings singles
Songs written by Roddy Bottum
Songs written by Mike Patton
Rap rock songs